Stephen Howard (born January 13, 1987) is a United States rugby league footballer who represented United States national rugby league team in the 2013 World Cup.

Playing career
Howard plays for the Tuggeranong Bushrangers in the Canberra Raiders Cup. In 2013 he won the club's best and fairest award.

In 2013, Howard was named in the United States squad for the World Cup.  He scored his first international try against Jamaica. In 2015, Stephen played for the United States in their 2017 Rugby League World Cup qualifiers.

Family
Howard is the brother of fellow US team member Daniel Howard.

References

External links
2017 RLWC profile

1987 births
Living people
American rugby league players
Rugby league second-rows
United States national rugby league team players